Cydia fagiglandana, the beech moth, is a moth of the family Tortricidae.

Distribution and habitat
This species  is present in most of Europe.  These moths mainly occur in  beech woodland.

Description

Cydia fagiglandana can reach a wingspan of 12–16 mm. The forewings are brown-black irrorated with whitish, crossed by pairs of fine dark brown stripes. The basal patch is slightly darker, the edge sharply angulated. There are two leaden-metallic streaks from costa posteriorly and a large darker coppery-tinged terminal patch hardly reaching costa. The ocellus within this patch is edged with leaden-metallic, enclosing some blackish marks. The hindwings are fuscous. The larvae are light yellowish or whitish, longitudinally clouded with orange; spots orange; head pale brownish; plate of 2 pale ochreous. This species is rather similar to Cydia splendana.

Biology
The moth flies from April to September depending on the location. They are active in the evening.  The larvae feed sometimes on oak (Quercus ilex, Quercus robur), but usually on beech nuts (Fagus sylvatica). The larval stage may last for two years. Pupation usually occurs in a cocoon spun in the soil or in rotten wood. The first adults emerge in late spring.

References

External links
 Papillions de Poitou-Charentes  
 Funet
 Lepiforum

Grapholitini
Moths of Japan
Moths of Europe